Queenworth was a  collier which was built in 1943 as Empire Citizen by Grangemouth Dockyard Co Ltd, Grangemouth for the Ministry of War Transport (MoWT). In 1946 she was sold into merchant service and renamed Queenworth, serving until 1960 when she was scrapped.

Description
The ship was built by Grangemouth Dockyard Co Ltd, Grangemouth. She was launched in 1943.

She had a GRT of 2,066 and a NRT of 1,073.

History
Empire Citizen was built for the MoWT. She was placed under the management of the Tanfield Steamship Co Ltd. Her port of registry was Grangemouth. The Code Letters BFLK and the United Kingdom Official Number 160699 were allocated.

In 1945, Empire Citizen was sold to the Watergate Steamship Co Ltd, Newcastle upon Tyne and was renamed Queenworth. She was operated under the management of Dalgliesh Ltd, Newcastle upon Tyne. Queenworth served until 1960 when she was scrapped at Dunston on Tyne.

References

External links
Photo of Queenworth

1943 ships
Ships built in Scotland
Empire ships
Ministry of War Transport ships
Steamships of the United Kingdom
Merchant ships of the United Kingdom